This is a list of recordings of Andrea Chénier, an opera by the composer Umberto Giordano, which was first performed at the Teatro alla Scala, Milan, on 28 March 1896.

Audio recordings

Video recordings

References

Opera discographies
Operas by Umberto Giordano